Yomaira De Jesus Cohen Epieyu (born 25 December 1982) is a Venezuelan Paralympic athlete who competes in discus throw, javelin throw and shot put at international track and field competitions. She is a three-time Parapan American Games silver medalist and has competed at the 2012, 2016 and 2020 Summer Paralympics.

On Christmas Day 1982, Cohen's mother gave birth to her in a trapped elevator in a hospital in Carabobo when she was going to the maternity ward, in the place that she was born, there was not enough oxygen and Yomaira had cerebral palsy on her left hand side. Cohen is married to fellow Paralympic athlete Juan Valladares.

References

1982 births
Living people
Sportspeople from Maracaibo
Paralympic athletes of Venezuela
Venezuelan female discus throwers
Venezuelan female javelin throwers
Venezuelan female shot putters
Athletes (track and field) at the 2012 Summer Paralympics
Athletes (track and field) at the 2016 Summer Paralympics
Athletes (track and field) at the 2020 Summer Paralympics
Medalists at the 2011 Parapan American Games
Medalists at the 2019 Parapan American Games
21st-century Venezuelan women